Shiftboard is a community online scheduling, recruitment, and time management tool that lets individuals and groups of participating organizations within a community collaborate for participation and overall staff work coverage and general accountability.

As employee scheduling software that is similar to a job board, communications, or other online forum, Shiftboard provides work portals that are used by large and small civic, non-profit/arts, charity, global healthcare, municipal, and staffing organizations.

Shiftboard is an active member of the open source software community and is headquartered in Seattle, Washington, USA.

External links

References

Administrative software
Web software